The 2022 Liège–Bastogne–Liège was a Belgian road cycling one-day race that took place on 24 April 2022 and was won by Remco Evenepoel. It was the 108th edition of Liège–Bastogne–Liège and the 17th event of the 2022 UCI World Tour.

Teams
Twenty-five teams were invited to the race, including all nineteen UCI WorldTeams and six UCI ProTeams. 

UCI WorldTeams

 
 
 
 
 
 
 
 
 
 
 
 
 
 
 
 
 
 

UCI ProTeams

Summary
2021 winner Tadej Pogačar pulled out of the race the day before due to a family emergency, with commentators & riders stating that the race would be much more open as a result. The  route from Liège to Liége was similar to that of recent years, with the key difference being the omission of Côte des Forges from the route following severe flooding in July 2021.

World champion Julian Alaphilippe and five other riders were injured in a large crash with around 60km to go. With 30km to go, Remco Evenepoel of Quick-Step Alpha Vinyl Team attacked on the Côte de La Redoute, and soloed the last 14km to victory in Liège, winning by 48 seconds. The podium places were decided by a sprint finish, with Quinten Hermans beating Wout van Aert for second place.

Result

References

Liège–Bastogne–Liège
Liège–Bastogne–Liège
Liège–Bastogne–Liège
Liège–Bastogne–Liège